The Hitcher(s) or Hitcher(s) may refer to:

 Hitcher, one who goes hitchhiking
 The Hitcher (1986 film), action horror film
 The Hitcher II: I've Been Waiting (2003), sequel
 The Hitcher (2007 film), slasher film and remake of the 1986 film
 The Hitcher (character), recurring character in The Mighty Boosh
 The Hitchers (band), band from the Irish city of Limerick formed in 1989

See also
 Hitch (disambiguation)
 Hitching (disambiguation)